Why Paint Cats is a humorous book written by New Zealand author Burton Silver and illustrator Heather Busch. It is one of three cat art books, including Why Cats Paint and Dancing with Cats. The book purports to describe the practice of "cat painting", the decorating of cats with paint. Some readers were concerned at the dangers of applying paint to cats, but the book's depictions are digitally manipulated.

Reception
Critical reception for the book has been mixed to positive, with the SF site calling it "luscious, funny, and really, truly amazing". Publishers Weekly wrote that the book was "amusing as a novelty item" and that it was "so weird that it's sort of irresistible." The Hamilton Spectator stated that the book's contents were "spectacular". The Los Angeles Times wrote that Silver's writing was "tongue-in-cheek scholarly, complete with footnotes and a bibliography".

References

External links 
 Snopes Urban Legend Reference

Fantasy art
Cats in popular culture
1994 non-fiction books
New Zealand books
Comedy books
Parody novels
Hoaxes in New Zealand
1994 hoaxes
Ten Speed Press books
Weidenfeld & Nicolson books
Books about cats